The changdao is a style of Chinese swords.

The name Changdao may also refer to:

 Changdao County in Shandong, China
 Changdao Town, a town in Xihe County, Gansu, China
 Li County in Gansu, China, known as Changdao during the Tang dynasty